The Bee-Line Bus System, the bus system for Westchester County, operates a network of bus routes throughout Westchester County, serving destinations throughout much of the county and parts of The Bronx in New York City. Routes are sometimes identified with a "W" prefix for Westchester County (ex: W60), following the same system used by the MTA. This is most evident at bus stops in the Bronx and on some maps and other publications from the MTA and the New York City government. They are also sometimes identified with the "BL" prefix (ex: BL60 or B-L60) on some MTA maps and signage. Bee-Line does not officially use this nomenclature, with the exception of the BxM4C. These routes are listed below.

This table gives details for the Bee-Line routes. For details on non-Bee-Line routes, see the following articles:
 List of bus routes in the Bronx: Bx16
 List of express bus routes in New York City: BxM3
 Connecticut Transit Stamford: 971 Stamford-White Plains Express
 Leprechaun Lines: Poughkeepsie–White Plains Commuter
 Transport of Rockland: Hudson Link

Routes
The Bee-Line's routes can be classified in several categories, as shown below. All Bee-Line routes accept MetroCard.

Connections to New York City Subway stations at the bus routes' terminals are also listed where applicable.

Service type

Local

Limited-stop and express

Westchester-Manhattan Express

Commuter

Shuttle Loops

Seasonal
These routes provide seasonal service to and from Playland (New York) during summers only. There is no service on Mondays, excluding certain holidays.

History of the current routes

Proposed new bus routes
In December 2020, a re-design was announced for the county bus system. The draft plan was released on July 19, 2022, with system-wide changes which are outlined below. These changes also bring in 100 series routes, which partially replace former portions of modified lines. If a bus route is not shown here, it was discontinued with the new plan, with the exception of the 75 and 91 routes, which were not part of the redesign due to being seasonal-only routes. Several discontinued bus routes are being replaced with on-demand "microtransit" lines.

Local

Limited-stop and express

Discontinued service

References

External links
  official website
 

Bus transportation in New York (state)
Transportation in Westchester County, New York
Lists of New York (state) bus routes